The 1993 Berlin Marathon was the 20th running of the annual marathon race held in Berlin, Germany, held on 26 September 1993. South Africa's Xolile Yawa won the men's race in 2:10:57 hours, while the women's race was won by Poland's Renata Kokowska in 2:26:20.

Results

Men

Women

References 

 Results. Association of Road Racing Statisticians. Retrieved 2020-04-02.

External links 
 Official website

1993 in Berlin
Berlin Marathon
Berlin Marathon
Berlin Marathon
Berlin Marathon